The Redressement Français (French Resurgence) was a French anti-parliamentarian movement founded in 1926 by the electricity magnate Ernest Mercier. It advocated technocratic corporatism - a "government of authority" - instead of a government of politicians.

Among its newspapers was the Revue Hebdomadaire.

References

Political parties of the French Third Republic